The Chippewa River in Wisconsin flows approximately 183 miles (294 km) through west-central and northwestern Wisconsin. It was once navigable for approximately 50 miles (80 km) of its length, from the Mississippi River, by Durand, northeast to Eau Claire. Its catchment defines a portion of the northern boundary of the Driftless Area. The river is easily accessible for bikers and pleasure seekers via the Chippewa River State Trail, which follows the river from Eau Claire to Durand.

Hydrography
The river is formed by the confluence of the West Fork Chippewa River, which rises at Chippewa Lake in southeastern Bayfield County, and the East Fork Chippewa River, which rises in the swamps of the southern part of the Town of Knight in Iron County, Wisconsin. The rivers' confluence is at Lake Chippewa, a reservoir in central Sawyer County, which is the official "beginning" of the Chippewa River.

The river flows from Sawyer County through Rusk, Chippewa, Eau Claire, Dunn, Pepin and Buffalo Counties, in Wisconsin, before emptying out into the Mississippi River. Sediment build-up at the river's mouth forms a delta that protrudes into the Mississippi, creating Lake Pepin in the process. Along the last  of its course, the main channel forms the county boundary between Pepin and Buffalo Counties.

Major lakes along the river's route include the Radisson and Holcombe Flowages, Lake Wissota and Dell's Pond, all of which are reservoirs. The largest reservoir by far is the Chippewa Flowage, which is the 3rd largest lake in Wisconsin.

The river's primary tributaries include the Couderay, Thornapple, Flambeau, Brunet, Jump, Fisher, Yellow, Eau Claire, Red Cedar and Eau Galle Rivers.

The river's confluence with the Red Cedar is just north of the Driftless Zone, at which point its floodplain widens out considerably, and includes numerous riverine islands.

The primary settlements along the river's course include Cornell, Chippewa Falls, Eau Claire, and Durand.

Historically, the Chippewa River was important as a float way for lumbering and papermaking.

The river has a deep, wide canyon, likely due to larger water discharges during Laurentide Ice Sheet retreat.

Chippewa River Bottoms is located along the river.

History
The 1742, Carte de la Louisiane et du Cours du Mississipi as "Rivière de bon Secours ou Hahatonouadeba", and then in the 1757 edition of the Mitchell Map as "Hahatonadeba River", the maps show the transliteration of the Dakota language name for the river Ḣaḣatuŋ[waŋ W]atpa. The word "Chippewa" is a rendering of "Ojibwe." The Ojibwe people controlled most of the upper Chippewa Valley and its tributaries until the Treaty of St. Peters in 1837.

Of the pine forests in Wisconsin in the 1800s, the Chippewa River system held more than even the Wisconsin River. It is estimated that the Chippewa system drained 34% of Wisconsin's pineries, as compared to 21% for the Wisconsin, 14% for the St. Croix, and 7% for the Black. Before logging, the Chippewa Valley probably held about 46,000,000,000 board feet of lumber. Frederick Weyerhaeuser described it as "a logger's paradise, a very large part of its area being heavily forested with the finest quality of white pine timber, while rivers, streams, and lakes offered an excellent network of transportation facilities."

The first sawmill in the Chippewa Valley was probably functioning at what would become Menomonie around 1831. By 1840, Jean Brunet and associates were sawing wood at Chippewa Falls. Floods destroyed these early mills, and the lumbermen rebuilt them. In the late 1800s, Chippewa Falls was said to have the largest sawmill under one roof in the world.

By the 1850s, the loggers were binding the sawed pine lumber into rafts which were guided down the lower Chippewa to markets on the Mississippi. Above Chippewa Falls, though, the river was too rough and rocky for large rafts. Masses of individual logs were driven down by log drivers, sometimes called "river pigs." To make the drives more efficient and reliable, the loggers changed the river somewhat, dynamiting troublesome rocks, cutting trees that would snag logs, building up the banks in places, and damming the river and its tributaries. Around 1876, a dam and log-sorting works were built between Eau Claire and Chippewa Falls. In 1878 a large splash dam was built at Little Falls (modern Holcombe), with so much capacity that when fully opened, it could raise the Chippewa three feet 100 miles downstream. Over the Chippewa and its tributaries, the loggers built at least 148 logging dams of various sizes and purposes.

Recreation
The Chippewa River is a popular destination for recreational kayakers and canoers. Paddlers experience a variety of conditions on the river, from calm, slow-moving water to small rapids and whitewater. Fishing is a popular activity: the river is known for musky, smallmouth bass, walleye, and northern pike.

See also
 List of Wisconsin rivers

References

Further reading
 Diary of Chippewa River Trip in 1868, C. H. Cooke, published in Eau Claire Leader Telegram in 1917. Cooke describes his canoe trip up the river from Eau Claire during the spring log drive of 1868.
 "Early Lumbering on the Chippewa", Vinette, Bruno, and William W. Bartlett, Wisconsin Magazine of History, 1926, Wisconsin Historical Society. Contains an early first-person account of logging and rafting on the Chippewa, with old photos.
 "Our Story 1776-1976 - The Chippewa Valley and Beyond" was an insert published by the Eau Claire Leader Telegram in 1976, edited by Arnie Hoffman. It includes articles on various aspects of local history, with local information and photos that are hard to find elsewhere.

External links

Driftless Area
Rivers of Wisconsin
Tributaries of the Mississippi River
Eau Claire, Wisconsin
Rivers of Eau Claire County, Wisconsin
Rivers of Chippewa County, Wisconsin
Rivers of Buffalo County, Wisconsin
Rivers of Pepin County, Wisconsin
Rivers of Dunn County, Wisconsin
Rivers of Sawyer County, Wisconsin